Franco Gallina (1 January 1945 – 5 July 2021) was an Italian footballer who played as a forward, most notably in the Serie A and the North American Soccer League.

Career 
Gallina played in the Serie D in 1962 with Casertana F.C. where he assisted in securing promotion after winning the Serie D title. The following season he was signed by Genoa C.F.C. of the Serie A, but failed to make an appearance. In 1964, he played in the Serie C with Virtus Entella, and later with Cesena F.C. He returned to his former club Genoa where he played in the Serie B. After two seasons with Genoa he played in the Serie A with Lanerossi Vicenza, and made his debut on 17 November 1968 against A.C. Milan.

In 1969, he returned to Serie C to play with Internapoli Football Club. He played abroad in 1971 with Montreal Olympique in the North American Soccer League. In his debut season with Montreal he was named to the NASL Second Team. The next season he played in the Mexican Primera División with Atlante F.C. In 1973, he played in the National Soccer League with Montreal Cantalia where he served as a player-coach. In 1974, he played with league rivals Toronto Italia once more in a capacity of a player-coach. The following season he played with Montreal Castors.

He died on 5 July 2021.

References

External links
 

1945 births
2021 deaths
Italian footballers
Association football forwards
Casertana F.C. players
Genoa C.F.C. players
Virtus Entella players
Cesena F.C. players
L.R. Vicenza players
Montreal Olympique players
Atlante F.C. footballers
Toronto Italia players
Montreal Castors players
Serie A players
Serie B players
Serie C players
Serie D players
North American Soccer League (1968–1984) players
Liga MX players
Canadian National Soccer League players
Canadian National Soccer League coaches
Italian football managers
Footballers from Naples
Italian expatriate footballers
Italian expatriate sportspeople in Canada
Expatriate soccer players in Canada
Italian expatriate sportspeople in Mexico
Expatriate footballers in Mexico